Ivana Isailović (born January 1, 1986, in Šabac, Yugoslavia) is a professional volleyball player from Serbia, who was a member of the Serbia women's national volleyball team that won the silver medal at the 2007 European Championship in Belgium and Luxembourg. She currently plays for Schweriner SC.

External links
 at world of volley
 

1986 births
Living people
Sportspeople from Šabac
Serbian women's volleyball players
Serbian expatriate sportspeople in Germany
Serbian expatriate sportspeople in Poland